Boguefala Creek is a stream in the U.S. state of Mississippi.

Boguefala Creek is a name derived from either the Choctaw language or Chickasaw language and it most likely means "long creek".

References

Rivers of Mississippi
Rivers of Itawamba County, Mississippi
Rivers of Lee County, Mississippi
Rivers of Monroe County, Mississippi
Mississippi placenames of Native American origin